Get out of My Stations is a 1994 EP by Guided by Voices. It was reissued with live bonus tracks on 25 August 2003.

Track listing

"This" side
 "Scalding Creek" (Robert Pollard) – 1:36
 "Mobile" (Mitch Mitchell, Jim Pollard, R. Pollard) – 1:24
 "Melted Pat" (R. Pollard) – 1:41
 "Queen of Second Guessing" – 1:22

"That" side
 "Dusty Bushworms" (R. Pollard) – 2:33
 "Spring Tiger" (R. Pollard) – 2:17
 "Blue Moon Fruit" – 1:33

2003 live bonus tracks (with locations)
 "Motor Away" - (Mys Tavern, Harrisburg 2/93) (R. Pollard, Tobin Sprout) – 2:11
 "Hot Freaks" - (Glenn's Hideaway, Lodi, 6/94 (R. Pollard, Sprout) – 2:10
 "Weed King" - (Khyber Pass, Phila; 8/92) (R. Pollard) – 2:37
 "Postal Blowfish" - (Boot & Saddle, Phila; 1/93) (Mitchell, R. Pollard) – 2:54

References

1994 EPs
Guided by Voices EPs